The Men's tournament of the 2020 New Holland Canadian Junior Curling Championships was held from January 18 to 26 at the George Preston Recreation Centre and the Langley Curling Centre.

In the final, Jacques Gauthier and his team of Jordan Peters, Brayden Payette and Zack Bilawka curling out of the Assiniboine Memorial Curling Club in Winnipeg, Manitoba defeated Newfoundland's Daniel Bruce rink 8–6 to make it an all Manitoba sweep in both the men's and women's events.

Teams
The teams are listed as follows:

Round-robin standings
Final round-robin standings

Round-robin results
All draw times are listed in Eastern Standard Time (UTC−5:00).

Pool A

Draw 1
Saturday, January 18, 9:00 am

Draw 2
Saturday, January 18, 2:00 pm

Draw 3
Saturday, January 18, 7:30 pm

Draw 4
Sunday, January 19, 9:00 am

Draw 5
Sunday, January 19, 2:00 pm

Draw 6
Sunday, January 19, 7:00 pm

Draw 7
Monday, January 20, 9:00 am

Draw 8
Monday, January 20, 2:00 pm

Draw 9
Monday, January 20, 7:00 pm

Draw 10
Tuesday, January 21, 9:00 am

Draw 11
Tuesday, January 21, 2:00 pm

Draw 12
Tuesday, January 21, 7:00 pm

Pool B

Draw 1
Saturday, January 18, 9:00 am

Draw 2
Saturday, January 18, 2:00 pm

Draw 3
Saturday, January 18, 7:30 pm

Draw 4
Sunday, January 19, 9:00 am

Draw 5
Sunday, January 19, 2:00 pm

Draw 6
Sunday, January 19, 7:00 pm

Draw 7
Monday, January 20, 9:00 am

Draw 8
Monday, January 20, 2:00 pm

Draw 9
Monday, January 20, 7:00 pm

Draw 10
Tuesday, January 21, 9:00 am

Draw 11
Tuesday, January 21, 2:00 pm

Draw 12
Tuesday, January 21, 7:00 pm

Tiebreaker
Wednesday, January 22, 9:00 am

Placement round

Seeding pool

Standings
Final Seeding Pool Standings

Draw 14
Wednesday, January 22, 2:00 pm

Draw 15
Wednesday, January 22, 7:00 pm

Draw 16
Thursday, January 23, 9:00 am

Draw 17
Thursday, January 23, 2:00 pm

Draw 18
Thursday, January 23, 7:00 pm

Draw 20
Friday, January 24, 2:00 pm

Championship pool

Championship pool standings
Final Championship Pool Standings

Draw 14
Wednesday, January 22, 2:00 pm

Draw 15
Wednesday, January 22, 7:00 pm

Draw 16
Thursday, January 23, 9:00 am

Draw 17
Thursday, January 23, 2:00 pm

Draw 18
Thursday, January 23, 7:00 pm

Draw 19
Friday, January 24, 9:00 am

Playoffs

Semifinal
Saturday, January 25, 11:00 am

Final
Sunday, January 26, 2:00 pm

References

External links

Junior Championships
Canadian Junior Curling Championships, 2020
Canadian Junior Curling Championships
Canadian Junior Curling